Ivan Aska (born 26 June 1990) is a U.S. Virgin Islander-Puerto Rican professional basketball player for DEAC of the Hungarian Nemzeti Bajnokság I/A. He has also represented the senior men's U.S. Virgin Islands national basketball team. He played college basketball for Murray State's Racers. He is a 2.03 m (6'8") tall power forward-center.

High school
Aska played high school basketball at Boyd H. Anderson High School, in Lauderdale Lakes, Florida.

College career
Aska played college basketball at Murray State University, with the Murray State Racers, from 2008 to 2012. He was named the Ohio Valley Conference Freshman of the Year in 2009, and second-team All-Ohio Valley Conference (OVC) in 2012. As a senior, Aska averaged 10.6 points and six rebounds per game.

Professional career
Aska signed with the German Basketball Bundesliga club ALBA Berlin, in 2015, but he left the club before playing in any official games with them. He joined the Greek Basket League club, PAOK, in March 2017.

On August 28, 2017, Aska signed a deal with the SLUC Nancy Basket out in France's LNB Pro A. On August 5, 2018, Aska returned to Greece once more for Kolossos Rodou.

On August 1, 2019, Aska returned to Israel for a second stint, signing a one-year deal with Hapoel Hevel Modi'in of the Israeli National League.

Aska joined Rabotnički in 2021 and averaged 13.8 points, 6.1 rebounds, and 1.3 steals per game. On August 3, 2021, Aska signed with DEAC of the Hungarian Nemzeti Bajnokság I/A.

The Basketball Tournament (TBT)
In the summer of 2017, Aska played in The Basketball Tournament on ESPN for Team Challenge ALS. He competed for the $2 million prize in 2017, and for Team Challenge ALS, he averaged 8.2 points per game. Aska helped take the sixth-seeded Team Challenge ALS to the Championship Game of the tournament, where they lost in a close game to Overseas Elite 86-83.

U.S. Virgin Islands national team
Aska has been a member of the senior men's U.S. Virgin Islands national basketball team. With the U.S. Virgin Islands, Aska has played at the following tournaments: the 2011 FIBA CBC Championship, where he won a gold medal, the 2012 Centrobasket, the 2015 FIBA CBC Championship, where he won a gold medal, and the 2016 Centrobasket.

He was named the MVP of the 2015 FIBA CBC Championship.

References

External links
FIBA profile (archive)
FIBA profile (game center)
Eurobasket.com Profile
Draftexpress.com profile
Greek Basket League profile 
Greek Basket League profile 
Murray State Racers bio
ESPN.com College Stats
Twitter Account

1990 births
Living people
Basketball players at the 2019 Pan American Games
Basketball players from Florida
Cangrejeros de Santurce basketball players
Centers (basketball)
Daegu KOGAS Pegasus players
Debreceni EAC (basketball) players
Hapoel Hevel Modi'in B.C. players
Ikaros B.C. players
Ironi Nes Ziona B.C. players
Ironi Ramat Gan players
Leuven Bears players
Maccabi Ashdod B.C. players
Murray State Racers men's basketball players
Pan American Games competitors for the United States Virgin Islands
P.A.O.K. BC players
Puerto Rican men's basketball players
Power forwards (basketball)
SLUC Nancy Basket players
Small forwards
United States Virgin Islands men's basketball players